Epsilon Octantis, Latinized from ε Octantis, is a star in the southern circumpolar constellation of Octans. It is a faintly visible to the naked eye with an apparent visual magnitude of about 5. The annual parallax shift of 11.22 mas yields a distance estimate of around 291 light years. It is moving further from the Sun with a radial velocity of +11.7 km/s.

This is an evolved, cool red giant star with a stellar classification of class M5III. It is a semiregular variable with a magnitude range of 4.58 to 5.30 and a (poorly defined) period around 55 days. The star has 1.34 times the mass of the Sun and has expanded to around 112 times the Sun's radius. It is radiating 1,819 times the Sun's luminosity from its enlarged photosphere at an effective temperature of 3,560 K.

Epsilon Octantis was found to be variable on a survey of the southern sky conducted by the Bamberg observatory, which was reported in 1966.  In 1972, it was assigned the variable star designation BO Octantis, although this is now recognised as a mistake since stars with Bayer designations are not given a separate variable star designation.

References

M-type giants
Semiregular variable stars
Octans
Octantis, Epsilon
CD-81 831
210967
110256
8481